is a Japanese anime miniseries based on the video game of the series.

Cast

Episode list

References

External links
 

2012 anime television series debuts
2012 Japanese television series endings
Anime television series based on video games
Fictional bakers
Mainichi Broadcasting System original programming
Production I.G
Sentai Filmworks
Shining (series)